The Commonwealth of Pagan Communities of Siberia–Siberian Veche (Russian: Содружество Языческих Общин Сибири–Сибирское Вече), also known as SibVeche (СибВече), is a Rodnover organisation which covers the region of Siberia, Russia, officially recognised by the government since 2015.

Though it is primarily devoted to Slavic religion, participation of individuals and communities of autochthonous Siberian religions is welcome, and some member communities (including Svarte Aske) follow Germanic Heathen beliefs. The organisation is headed by Trislav from Altai Krai and has communities in Novosibirsk, Krasnoyarsk, Tomsk, Kemerovo, Barnaul and the Rebrikhinsky District of Altai Krai, but also in Almaty, Kazakhstan.

See also
 Slavic Native Faith
 Tengrism

References

Sources
 
 

Modern pagan organizations based in Russia
Religion in Siberia
Slavic neopaganism
Religious organizations established in 2015
Modern pagan organizations established in the 2010s